Balfouriidae is a family of flatworms belonging to the order Plagiorchiida. The family consists of only one genus: Balfouria Leiper, 1911.

References

Platyhelminthes